Johnny Kenny (born 6 June 2003) is an Irish professional footballer who plays as a forward for League of Ireland Premier Division club Shamrock Rovers, on loan from Scottish Premiership club Celtic. His father, also Johnny, played for Sligo in the 1990s

Club career

Sligo Rovers
In January 2021, Kenny signed his first professional contract with Sligo Rovers. He made his debut in March, in a 1–1 draw with Dundalk. One month later, he scored his first senior goal against Finn Harps.

Like his father Johnny also scored in European football for Sligo

Celtic
Kenny signed a five-year deal with Celtic in January 2022. He was loaned to Queen's Park in August 2022.

Shamrock Rovers
On 28 December 2022, it was announced that Kenny would be joining League of Ireland Premier Division club Shamrock Rovers on loan for their 2023 season.

International career
In November 2021, Kenny made his debut for the Republic of Ireland under-19 team, scoring in a 3–2 victory over Montenegro.

Career statistics

References

2003 births
Living people
Republic of Ireland association footballers
Sligo Rovers F.C. players
Celtic F.C. players
League of Ireland players
Association football forwards
Republic of Ireland expatriate association footballers
Irish expatriate sportspeople in Scotland
Expatriate footballers in Scotland
Republic of Ireland youth international footballers
Lowland Football League players
Queen's Park F.C. players
Shamrock Rovers F.C. players
Sportspeople from County Sligo
Scottish Professional Football League players